Muskaan (English: Smile) is a 2004 Indian Hindi-language romantic-thriller film directed by Rohit-Manish. It stars Aftab Shivdasani and Gracy Singh in pivotal roles.

Plot
Dashing and debonair fashion designer Sameer Oberoi (Aftab Shivdasani) has everything going for him, a successful career; a secure future; a comfortable and wealthy lifestyle; a beautiful girl Jahnvi (Neha) who hopes to marry him, what more could anyone want? But Sameer has an image of his dream-girl in his mind, and he hopes to find her soon. His search for her meets with obstacles of searching for a better model; a series of wrong telephonic connections, all connecting him to a young lady. His group decides to travel to another location, and the young "wrong number" lady, named Muskaan also travels in the same bus, leading to some more misunderstandings. Sameer takes a liking to Muskaan and decides to appoint her as his new model, to which she agrees. Then their world is turned upside down when Jahnvi a member of their group is brutally stabbed in stomach and murdered, and the only clue the police have is that her killer's name begins with an "S", and Sameer becomes a prime suspect in her murder, and in the eyes of Inspector Vikram Rajput, who is determined to get the killer at any cost. During the search for the killer, Muskaan (Gracy Singh) and Sameer fall in love. Just as they are about to go to the police station, Muskaan arrives with the cassette in which Jahnvi had left a message for her dad. After hearing this, the killer is actually Satin (one of Sameer's best friend). In the end, Satin is arrested and Muskaan and Sameer reunite.

Cast
 Aftab Shivdasani... Sameer Oberoi
 Gracy Singh... Muskaan
 Gulshan Grover... Inspector Vikram Rajput
 Neha... Jahnvi
 Anjala Zaveri... Shikha
 Parvin Dabas... Sharad
 Vrajesh Hirjee... Saturn
 Razak Khan... Hotel Manager
 Poonam Simar... Shweta
 Rajeev Verma... Jahnvi's Dad
Sharat Saxena

Soundtrack 

The music of the film was composed by the duo Nikhil-Vinay and the lyrics were penned By Sameer. Shreya Ghoshal dubbed Anuradha Paudwal's song "Woh Ho Tum", but Anuradha Paudwal's song was very popular. "Jaaneman Chupke Chupke", Anuradha Paudwal's solo song was more popular than Alka and Udit's duet.
The soundtrack was released 2004 Audio on T-Series, which consists of 11 songs. The full album was recorded by Anuradha Paudwal, Udit Narayan, Shreya Ghoshal, Sonu Nigam, Alka Yagnik, Shaan and Adnan Sami.
The music of the film was an instant hit of the respective year.

References

External links

2000s Hindi-language films
2004 films
Films scored by Nikhil-Vinay